The 2018–19 synchronized skating season began on July 1, 2018, and ended on June 30, 2019. Running concurrent with the 2018–19 figure skating season. During this season, elite synchronized skating teams competed in the ISU Championship level at the 2019 World Championships. They also competed at various other elite level international and national competitions.

Competitions 
The 2018–19 season included the following major competitions.

 Key

International medalists

References 

2018 in figure skating
2019 in figure skating
Seasons in synchronized skating